Paradis is a census-designated place (CDP) in St. Charles Parish, Louisiana, United States. The population was 1,252 at the 2000 census and 1,242 in 2020.

Geography
Paradis is located at  (29.877743, -90.435598).

Demographics

Education
St. Charles Parish Public School System operates public schools:
R. J. Vial Elementary School (grades 3–5) - Opened in 1975
J.B. Martin Middle School (grades 6–8)
Hahnville High School in Boutte

References

Census-designated places in Louisiana
Census-designated places in St. Charles Parish, Louisiana
Census-designated places in New Orleans metropolitan area